

Events

Pre-1600
41 – After a night of negotiation, Claudius is accepted as Roman emperor by the Senate.
 750 – In the Battle of the Zab, the Abbasid rebels defeat the Umayyad Caliphate, leading to the overthrow of the dynasty.
1348 – A strong earthquake strikes the South Alpine region of Friuli in modern Italy, causing considerable damage to buildings as far away as Rome.
1494 – Alfonso II becomes King of Naples.
1515 – Coronation of Francis I of France takes place at Reims Cathedral, where the new monarch is anointed with the oil of Clovis and girt with the sword of Charlemagne.
1533 – Henry VIII of England secretly marries his second wife Anne Boleyn.
1554 – São Paulo, Brazil, is founded by Jesuit priests.
1573 – Battle of Mikatagahara: In Japan, Takeda Shingen defeats Tokugawa Ieyasu.
1576 – Luanda, the capital of Angola, is founded by the Portuguese navigator Paulo Dias de Novais.
1585 – Walter Raleigh is knighted, shortly after renaming North America region "Virginia", in honor of Elizabeth I, Queen of England, sometimes referred to as the "Virgin Queen".

1601–1900
1704 – The Battle of Ayubale results in the destruction of most of the Spanish missions in Florida.
1755 – Moscow University is established on Tatiana Day.
1765 – Port Egmont, the first British settlement in the Falkland Islands near the southern tip of South America, is founded.
1787 – Shays's Rebellion: The rebellion's largest confrontation, outside the Springfield Armory, results in the killing of four rebels and the wounding of twenty.
1791 – The British Parliament passes the Constitutional Act of 1791 and splits the old Province of Quebec into Upper Canada and Lower Canada.
1792 – The London Corresponding Society is founded.
1819 – University of Virginia chartered by Commonwealth of Virginia, with Thomas Jefferson one of its founders.
1858 – The Wedding March by Felix Mendelssohn is played at the marriage of Queen Victoria's daughter, Victoria, and Friedrich of Prussia, and becomes a popular wedding processional.
1879 – The Bulgarian National Bank is founded.
1881 – Thomas Edison and Alexander Graham Bell form the Oriental Telephone Company.
1890 – Nellie Bly completes her round-the-world journey in 72 days.

1901–present
1909 – Richard Strauss's opera Elektra receives its debut performance at the Dresden State Opera.
1915 – Alexander Graham Bell inaugurates U.S. transcontinental telephone service, speaking from New York to Thomas Watson in San Francisco.
1917 – Sinking of the SS Laurentic after hitting two German mines off the coast of Northern Ireland.
1918 – The Ukrainian People's Republic declares independence from Soviet Russia.
  1918   – The Finnish Defence Forces (The White Guards) are established as the official army of independent Finland, and Baron C. G. E. Mannerheim is appointed its Commander-in-Chief.
1924 – The 1924 Winter Olympics opens in Chamonix, in the French Alps, inaugurating the Winter Olympic Games.
1932 – Second Sino-Japanese War: The Chinese National Revolutionary Army begins the defense of Harbin.
1937 – The Guiding Light debuts on NBC radio from Chicago. In 1952 it moves to CBS television, where it remains until September 18, 2009.
1941 – Pope Pius XII elevates the Apostolic Vicariate of the Hawaiian Islands to the dignity of a diocese. It becomes the Roman Catholic Diocese of Honolulu.
1942 – World War II: Thailand declares war on the United States and United Kingdom.
1945 – World War II: The Battle of the Bulge ends.
1946 – The United Mine Workers rejoins the American Federation of Labor.
  1946   – United Nations Security Council Resolution 1 relating to Military Staff Committee is adopted.
1947 – Thomas Goldsmith Jr. files a patent for a "Cathode Ray Tube Amusement Device", the first ever electronic game.
1949 – The first Emmy Awards are presented in the United States; the venue is the Hollywood Athletic Club.
1960 – The National Association of Broadcasters in the United States reacts to the "payola" scandal by threatening fines for any disc jockeys who accept money for playing particular records.
1961 – In Washington, D.C., US President John F. Kennedy delivers the first live presidential television news conference.
1964 – Blue Ribbon Sports, which would later become Nike, is founded by University of Oregon track and field athletes.
1967 – South Vietnamese junta leader and Prime Minister Nguyen Cao Ky fires rival, Deputy Prime Minister and Defence Minister Nguyen Huu Co, while the latter is overseas on a diplomatic visit.
1969 – Brazilian Army captain Carlos Lamarca deserts in order to fight against the military dictatorship, taking with him ten machine guns and 63 rifles.
1971 – Charles Manson and four "Family" members (three of them female) are found guilty of the 1969 Tate–LaBianca murders.
  1971   – Idi Amin leads a coup deposing Milton Obote and becomes Uganda's president.
1979 – Pope John Paul II starts his first official papal visits outside Italy to The Bahamas, Dominican Republic, and Mexico.
1980 – Mother Teresa is honored with India's highest civilian award, the Bharat Ratna.
1986 – The National Resistance Movement topples the government of Tito Okello in Uganda.
1990 – Avianca Flight 52 crashes in Cove Neck, New York, killing 73.
1993 – Five people are shot outside the CIA Headquarters in Langley, Virginia. Two are killed and three wounded.
1994 – The spacecraft Clementine by BMDO and NASA is launched.
1995 – The Norwegian rocket incident: Russia almost launches a nuclear attack after it mistakes Black Brant XII, a Norwegian research rocket, for a US Trident missile.
1996 – Billy Bailey becomes the last person to be hanged in the United States.
1998 – During a historic visit to Cuba, Pope John Paul II demands political reforms and the release of political prisoners while condemning US attempts to isolate the country.
  1998   – A suicide attack by the Liberation Tigers of Tamil Eelam on Sri Lanka's Temple of the Tooth kills eight and injures 25 others.
1999 – A 6.0 magnitude earthquake hits western Colombia killing at least 1,000.
2003 – Invasion of Iraq: A group of people leave London, England, for Baghdad, Iraq, to serve as human shields, intending to prevent the U.S.-led coalition troops from bombing certain locations.
2005 – A stampede at the Mandhradevi temple in Maharashtra, India kills at least 258.
2006 – Mexican professional wrestler Juana Barraza is arrested in connection with the serial killing of at least ten elderly women.
  2010   – Ethiopian Airlines Flight 409 crashes into the Mediterranean Sea off the coast of Na'ameh, Lebanon, killing 90.
2011 – The first wave of the Egyptian revolution begins throughout the country, marked by street demonstrations, rallies, acts of civil disobedience, riots, labour strikes, and violent clashes.
2013 – At least 50 people are killed and 120 people are injured in a prison riot in Barquisimeto, Venezuela.
2015 – A clash in Mamasapano, Maguindanao in the Philippines kills 44 members of Special Action Force (SAF), at least 18 from the Moro Islamic Liberation Front and five from the Bangsamoro Islamic Freedom Fighters.
2019 – A mining company's dam collapses in Brumadinho, Brazil, a south-eastern city, killing 270 people.

Births

Pre-1600
 750 – Leo IV the Khazar, Byzantine emperor (d. 780)
1408 – Katharina of Hanau, German countess regent (d. 1460)
1459 – Paul Hofhaimer, Austrian organist and composer (d. 1537)
1477 – Anne of Brittany (probable; d. 1514)
1509 – Giovanni Morone, Italian cardinal (d. 1580)
1526 – Adolf, Duke of Holstein-Gottorp (d. 1586)

1601–1900
1615 – Govert Flinck, Dutch painter (d. 1660)
1627 – Robert Boyle, Anglo-Irish chemist and physicist (d. 1691)
1634 – Gaspar Fagel, Dutch politician and diplomat (d. 1688)
1635 – Daniel Casper von Lohenstein, German writer, diplomat and lawyer (d. 1683)
1640 – William Cavendish, 1st Duke of Devonshire, English soldier and politician, Lord Steward of the Household (d. 1707)
1736 – Joseph-Louis Lagrange, Italian-French mathematician and astronomer (d. 1813)
1739 – Charles François Dumouriez, French general and politician, French Minister of Defence (d. 1823)
1743 – Friedrich Heinrich Jacobi, German philosopher and author (d. 1819)
1750 – Johann Gottfried Vierling, German organist and composer (d. 1813)
1755 – Paolo Mascagni, Italian physician and anatomist (probable; d. 1815)
1759 – Robert Burns, Scottish poet and songwriter (d. 1796)
1783 – William Colgate, English-American businessman and philanthropist, founded Colgate-Palmolive (d. 1857)
1794 – François-Vincent Raspail, French chemist, physician, physiologist, and lawyer (d. 1878)
1796 – William MacGillivray, Scottish ornithologist and biologist (d. 1852)
1813 – J. Marion Sims, American gynecologist and physician (d. 1883)
1816 – Anna Gardner, American abolitionist and teacher (d. 1901)
1822 – Charles Reed Bishop, American businessman, philanthropist, and politician, founded the Bishop Museum (d. 1915)
  1822   – William McDougall, Canadian lawyer and politician, Lieutenant Governor of the Northwest Territories (d. 1905)
1823 – José María Iglesias, Mexican politician and interim President (d. 1891)
1824 – Michael Madhusudan Dutt, Indian poet and playwright (d. 1873)
1841 – John Fisher, 1st Baron Fisher, English admiral (d. 1920)
1858 – Mikimoto Kōkichi, Japanese businessman (d. 1954)
1860 – Charles Curtis, American lawyer and politician, 31st Vice President of the United States (d. 1936)
1864 – Julije Kempf, Croatian historian and author (d. 1934)
1868 – Juventino Rosas, Mexican violinist and composer (d. 1894)
1874 – W. Somerset Maugham, British playwright, novelist, and short story writer (d. 1965)
1878 – Ernst Alexanderson, Swedish-American engineer (d. 1975)
1882 – Virginia Woolf, English novelist, essayist, short story writer, and critic (d. 1941)
1885 – Kitahara Hakushū, Japanese poet and author (d. 1942)
1886 – Wilhelm Furtwängler, German conductor and composer (d. 1954)
1894 – Aino Aalto, Finnish architect and designer (d. 1949)
1895 – Florence Mills, American singer, dancer, and actress (d. 1927)
1899 – Sleepy John Estes, American singer-songwriter and guitarist (d. 1977)
  1899   – Paul-Henri Spaak, Belgian lawyer and politician, 46th Prime Minister of Belgium (d. 1972)
1900 – István Fekete, Hungarian author (d. 1970)
  1900   – Yōjirō Ishizaka, Japanese author and educator (d. 1986)
  1900   – Theodosius Dobzhansky, Russian-American geneticist and pioneer of evolutionary biology (d. 1975)

1901–present
1901 – Mildred Dunnock, American actress (d. 1991)
1905 – Maurice Roy, Canadian cardinal (d. 1985)
  1905   – Margery Sharp, English author and educator (d. 1991)
1906 – Toni Ulmen, German racing driver and motorcycle racer (d. 1976)
1908 – Hsieh Tung-min, Taiwanese politicians and Vice President of the Republic of China (d. 2001)
1910 – Edgar V. Saks, Estonian historian, author, and politician, Estonian Minister of Education (d. 1984)
1913 – Huang Hua, Chinese translator and politician, 5th Foreign Minister of the People's Republic of China (d. 2010)
  1913   – Witold Lutosławski, Polish composer and conductor (d. 1994)
  1913   – Luis Marden, American photographer and journalist (d. 2003)
1914 – William Strickland, American conductor and organist (d. 1991)
1915 – Ewan MacColl, English singer-songwriter, actor and producer (d. 1989)
1916 – Pop Ivy, American football player and coach (d. 2003)
1917 – Ilya Prigogine, Russian-Belgian chemist and physicist, Nobel Prize laureate (d. 2003)
  1917   – Jânio Quadros, Brazilian lawyer and politician, 22nd President of Brazil (d. 1992)
1919 – Edwin Newman, American journalist and author (d. 2010)
1921 – Samuel T. Cohen, American physicist and academic (d. 2010)
  1921   – Josef Holeček, Czechoslovakian canoeist (d. 2005)
1922 – Raymond Baxter, English television host and pilot (d. 2006)
1923 – Arvid Carlsson, Swedish pharmacologist and physician, Nobel Prize laureate (d. 2018)
  1923   – Shirley Ardell Mason, American psychiatric patient (d. 1998)
  1923   – Sally Starr, American actress and television host (d. 2013)
  1923   – Jean Taittinger, French politician, French Minister of Justice (d. 2012)
1924 – Lou Groza, American football player and coach (d. 2000)
  1924   – Husein Mehmedov, Bulgarian-Turkish wrestler and coach (d. 2014)
  1924   – Speedy West, American guitarist and producer (d. 2003)
1925 – Gordy Soltau, American football player and sportscaster (d. 2014)
  1925   – Giorgos Zampetas, Greek bouzouki player and songwriter (d. 1992)
1926 – Dick McGuire, American basketball player and coach (d. 2010)
1927 – Antônio Carlos Jobim, Brazilian singer-songwriter and pianist (d. 1994)
1928 – Jérôme Choquette, Canadian lawyer and politician (d. 2017)
  1928   – Eduard Shevardnadze, Georgian general and politician, 2nd President of Georgia (d. 2014)
  1928   – Cor van der Hart, Dutch footballer and manager (d. 2006)
1929 – Elizabeth Allen, American actress and singer (d. 2006)
  1929   – Robert Faurisson, English-French author and academic (d. 2018)
  1929   – Benny Golson, American saxophonist and composer
1930 – Tanya Savicheva, Russian child diarist (d. 1944)
1931 – Dean Jones, American actor and singer (d. 2015)
1933 – Corazon Aquino, Filipino politician, 11th President of the Philippines (d. 2009)
1935 – Conrad Burns, American journalist, and politician (d. 2016)
  1935   – António Ramalho Eanes, Portuguese general and politician, 16th President of Portugal
  1935   – Don Maynard, American football player (d. 2022)
1936 – Diana Hyland, American actress (d. 1977)
  1936   – Onat Kutlar, Turkish author and poet (d. 1995)
1937 – Ange-Félix Patassé, Central African engineer and politician, President of the Central African Republic (d. 2011)
1938 – Shotaro Ishinomori, Japanese author and illustrator (d. 1998)
  1938   – Etta James, American singer (d. 2012)
  1938   – Leiji Matsumoto, Japanese author, illustrator, and animator
  1938   – Vladimir Vysotsky, Russian singer-songwriter, actor, and poet (d. 1980)
1941 – Buddy Baker, American race car driver and sportscaster (d. 2015)
1942 – Carl Eller, American football player and sportscaster
  1942   – Eusébio, Mozambican-Portuguese footballer (d. 2014)
1943 – Tobe Hooper, American director, producer, and screenwriter (d. 2017)
1945 – Leigh Taylor-Young, American actress
1947 – Ángel Nieto, Spanish motorcycle racer (d. 2017)
  1947   – Tostão, Brazilian footballer, journalist, and physician
1948 – Ros Kelly, Australian educator and politician, 1st Australian Minister for Defence Science and Personnel
  1948   – Georgy Shishkin, Russian painter and illustrator
1949 – John Cooper Clarke, English poet and critic
  1949   – Paul Nurse, English geneticist and biologist, Nobel Prize laureate
1950 – Gloria Naylor, American novelist (d. 2016)
1951 – Steve Prefontaine, American runner (d. 1975)
1952 – Peter Tatchell, Australian-English journalist and activist
  1952   – Timothy White, American journalist, author, and critic (d. 2002)
1954 – Ricardo Bochini, Argentinian footballer and manager
  1954   – Kay Cottee, Australian sailor
  1954   – Renate Dorrestein, Dutch journalist and author (d. 2018)
1956 – Andy Cox, English guitarist 
  1956   – Dinah Manoff, American actress
1957 – Eskil Erlandsson, Swedish technologist and politician, Swedish Minister for Rural Affairs
  1957   – Andrew Harris, American politician
  1957   – Jenifer Lewis, American actress and singer
1958 – Franco Pancheri, Italian footballer and manager
1961 – Vivian Balakrishnan, Singaporean ophthalmologist and politician, Singaporean Ministry of National Development
1962 – Chris Chelios, American ice hockey player and manager
1963 – Fernando Haddad, Brazilian academic and politician, 61st Mayor of São Paulo
  1963   – Molly Holzschlag, American computer scientist and author
1964 – Stephen Pate, Australian cyclist
1965 – Esa Tikkanen, Finnish ice hockey player and coach
1966 – Chet Culver, American educator and politician, 41st Governor of Iowa
  1966   – Yiannos Ioannou, Cypriot footballer and manager
  1966   – Mark Schlereth, American football player and sportscaster
1967 – Nelson Asaytono, Filipino basketball player
  1967   – David Ginola, French footballer
  1967   – Randy McKay, Canadian ice hockey player and coach
1968 – Eric Orie, Dutch footballer and manager
1969 – Sergei Ovchinnikov, Russian volleyball player and coach (d. 2012)
1970 – Stephen Chbosky, American author, screenwriter, and director
  1970   – Chris Mills, American basketball player
  1970   – Milt Stegall, American football player and sportscaster
1971 – Luca Badoer, Italian racing driver
  1971   – Philip Coppens, Belgian journalist and author (d. 2012)
  1971   – Ana Ortiz, American actress
1972 – Shinji Takehara, Japanese boxer
1973 – Geoff Johns, American author, screenwriter, and producer
1974 – Robert Budreau, Canadian director, producer, and screenwriter
  1974   – Emily Haines, Canadian singer-songwriter and keyboard player
  1974   – Attilio Nicodemo, Italian footballer
1975 – Duncan Jupp, Anglo-Scottish footballer 
  1975   – Mia Kirshner, Canadian actress
1976 – Stephanie Bellars, American wrestler and manager
  1976   – Mário Haberfeld, Brazilian racing driver
  1976   – Dimitris Nalitzis, Greek footballer
1977 – Michael Brown, English footballer, manager and pundit 
1978 – Ahmet Dursun, Turkish footballer
  1978   – Denis Menchov, Russian cyclist
  1978   – Derrick Turnbow, American baseball player
  1978   – Volodymyr Zelenskyy, President of Ukraine and actor
1979 – Rodrigo Ribeiro, Brazilian racing driver
1980 – Alayna Burns, Australian track cyclist
  1980   – Xavi, Spanish footballer
1981 – Francis Jeffers, English footballer
  1981   – Alicia Keys, American singer-songwriter, pianist, and actress
  1981   – Toše Proeski, Macedonian singer (d. 2007)
1984 – Jay Briscoe, American professional wrestler (d. 2023)
  1984   – Stefan Kießling, German footballer
  1984   – Robinho, Brazilian footballer
  1984   – Fara Williams, English footballer
1985 – Brent Celek, American football player
  1985   – Patrick Willis, American football player
  1985   – Hwang Jung-eum, South Korean actress
1986 – Chris O'Grady, English footballer
1987 – Maria Kirilenko, Russian tennis player
1988 – Tatiana Golovin, French tennis player
  1988   – Ryota Ozawa, Japanese actor
1990 – Apostolos Giannou, Greek-Australian footballer
  1990   – Lee Jun-ho, South Korean singer and actor
1996 – Hyun Seung-hee, South Korean singer and television personality
2001 – Elisabetta Cocciaretto, Italian tennis player
2002 – Lil Mosey, American rapper

Deaths

Pre-1600
 390 – Gregory Nazianzus, theologian and Patriarch of Constantinople (b. 329)
 477 – Gaiseric, king of the Vandals (b. 389)
 750 – Ibrahim ibn al-Walid, Umayyad caliph
 844 – Pope Gregory IV (b. 795)
 863 – Charles of Provence, Frankish king (b. 845)
 951 – Ma Xiguang, ruler of Chu (Ten Kingdoms)
1003 – Lothair I, Margrave of the Nordmark
1067 – Emperor Yingzong of Song (b. 1032)
1138 – Antipope Anacletus II
1139 – Godfrey I, Count of Louvain and Duke of Lower Lorraine (as Godfrey VI)
1366 – Henry Suso, German priest and mystic (b. 1300)
1413 – Maud de Ufford, Countess of Oxford (b. 1345)
1431 – Charles II, Duke of Lorraine (b. 1364)
1492 – Ygo Gales Galama, Frisian warlord and rebel (b. 1443)
1494 – Ferdinand I of Naples (b. 1423)
1559 – Christian II of Denmark (b. 1481)
1578 – Mihrimah Sultan of the Ottoman Empire (b. 1522)
1586 – Lucas Cranach the Younger, German painter (b. 1515)

1601–1900
1640 – Robert Burton, English physician and scholar (b. 1577)
1670 – Nicholas Francis, Duke of Lorraine (b. 1612)
1726 – Guillaume Delisle, French cartographer (b. 1675)
1733 – Sir Gilbert Heathcote, 1st Baronet, English banker and politician, Lord Mayor of London (b. 1652)
1742 – Edmond Halley, English astronomer (b. 1656)
1751 – Paul Dudley, American lawyer, jurist, and politician (b. 1675)
1852 – Fabian Gottlieb von Bellingshausen, Russian admiral, cartographer, and explorer (b. 1778)
1872 – Richard S. Ewell, American general (b. 1817)
1881 – Konstantin Thon, Russian architect, designed the Grand Kremlin Palace and Cathedral of Christ the Saviour (b. 1794)
1884 – Périclès Pantazis, Greek-Belgian painter (b. 1849)
1891 – Theo van Gogh, Art dealer, the brother of Vincent van Gogh (b. 1857)
1900 – Princess Adelheid of Hohenlohe-Langenburg, German Duchess of Schleswig-Holstein (b. 1835)

1901–present
1907 – René Pottier, French cyclist (b. 1879)
1908 – Ouida, English-Italian author (b. 1839)
  1908   – Mikhail Chigorin, Russian chess player and theoretician (b. 1850)
1910 – W. G. Read Mullan, American Jesuit and academic (1860)
1914 – Frank Avery Hutchins, American librarian and educator (b. 1851)
1912 – Dmitry Milyutin, Russian field marshal and politician (b. 1816)
1925 – Juan Vucetich, Croatian-Argentinian anthropologist and police officer (b. 1858)
1939 – Charles Davidson Dunbar, Scottish soldier and bagpipe player (b. 1870)
1947 – Al Capone, American gangster and mob boss (b. 1899)
1949 – Makino Nobuaki, Japanese politician, 15th Japanese Minister for Foreign Affairs (b. 1861)
1957 – Ichizō Kobayashi, Japanese businessman, founded Hankyu Hanshin Holdings (b. 1873)
  1957   – Kiyoshi Shiga, Japanese physician and bacteriologist (b. 1871)
1958 – Cemil Topuzlu, Turkish surgeon and politician, Mayor of Istanbul (b. 1866)
  1958   – Robert R. Young, American businessman and financier (b. 1897)
1960 – Diana Barrymore, American actress (b. 1921)
1966 – Saul Adler, Belarusian-English microbiologist and parasitologist (b. 1895)
1968 – Louie Myfanwy Thomas, Welsh writer (b. 1908)
1970 – Jane Bathori, French soprano (b. 1877)
  1970   – Eiji Tsuburaya, Japanese director and producer (b. 1901)
1971 – Barry III, Guinean lawyer and politician (b. 1923)
1972 – Erhard Milch, German field marshal (b. 1892)
1975 – Charlotte Whitton, Canadian journalist and politician, 46th Mayor of Ottawa (b. 1896)
1978 – Skender Kulenović, Bosnian author, poet, and playwright (b. 1910)
1981 – Adele Astaire, American actress, singer, and dancer (b. 1896)
1982 – Mikhail Suslov, Russian economist and politician (b. 1902)
1985 – Ilias Iliou, Greek jurist and politician (b. 1904)
1987 – Frank J. Lynch, American lawyer, judge, and politician (b. 1922)
1988 – Colleen Moore, American actress (b. 1899)
1990 – Ava Gardner, American actress (b. 1922)
1991 – Frank Soo, English footballer and manager (b. 1914)
1992 – Mir Khalil ur Rehman, Founder and editor of the Jang Group of Newspapers (b. 1927)
1994 – Stephen Cole Kleene, American mathematician, computer scientist, and academic (b. 1909)
1996 – Jonathan Larson, American playwright and composer (b. 1960)
1997 – Dan Barry, American author and illustrator (b. 1923)
1999 – Sarah Louise Delany, American author and educator (b. 1889)
  1999   – Robert Shaw, American conductor (b. 1916)
2001 – Alice Ambrose, American philosopher and logician (b. 1906)
2002 – Cliff Baxter, employee at Enron (b. 1958)
2003 – Sheldon Reynolds, American director, producer, and screenwriter (b. 1923)
  2003   – Samuel Weems, American lawyer and author (b. 1936)
2004 – Fanny Blankers-Koen, Dutch runner and hurdler (b. 1918)
  2004   – Miklós Fehér, Hungarian footballer (b. 1979)
2005 – Stanisław Albinowski, Polish economist and journalist (b. 1923)
  2005   – William Augustus Bootle, American lawyer and judge (b. 1902)
  2005   – Philip Johnson, American architect, designed the PPG Place and Crystal Cathedral (b. 1906)
  2005   – Manuel Lopes, Cape Verdean author and poet (b. 1907)
  2005   – Netti Witziers-Timmer, Dutch runner (b. 1923)
2009 – Eleanor F. Helin, American astronomer (b. 1932)
  2009   – Ewald Kooiman, Dutch organist and educator (b. 1938)
  2009   – Kim Manners, American director and producer (b. 1951)
2010 – Ali Hassan al-Majid, Iraqi general and politician, Iraqi Minister of Defence (b. 1941)
2011 – Vassilis C. Constantakopoulos Greek captain and businessman (b. 1935)
  2011   – Vincent Cronin, Welsh historian and author (b. 1924)
2012 – Paavo Berglund, Finnish violinist and conductor (b. 1929)
  2012   – Jacques Maisonrouge, French businessman (b. 1924)
  2012   – Franco Pacini, Italian astrophysicist and academic (b. 1939)
  2012   – Robert Sheran, American lawyer, judge, and politician (b. 1916)
2013 – Martial Asselin, Canadian lawyer and politician, 25th Lieutenant Governor of Quebec (b. 1924)
  2013   – Kevin Heffernan, Irish footballer and manager (b. 1929)
  2013   – Aase Nordmo Løvberg, Norwegian soprano and actress (b. 1923)
2014 – Arthur Doyle, American singer-songwriter, saxophonist, and flute player (b. 1944)
  2014   – Heini Halberstam, Czech-English mathematician and academic (b. 1926)
  2014   – Dave Strack, American basketball player and coach (b. 1923)
2015 – John Leggett, American author and academic (b. 1917)
  2015   – Richard McBrien, American priest, theologian, and academic (b. 1936)
  2015   – Bill Monbouquette, American baseball player and coach (b. 1936)
  2015   – Demis Roussos, Egyptian-Greek singer (b. 1946)
2017 – Stephen P. Cohen, Canadian academic (b. 1945)
  2017   – Robert Garcia, American politician (b. 1933)
  2017   – John Hurt, English actor (b. 1940)
  2017   – Harry Mathews, American novelist and poet (b. 1930)
  2017   – Marcel Prud'homme, Canadian politician (b. 1934)
  2017   – Mary Tyler Moore, American actress and producer (b. 1936)
2018 – Neagu Djuvara, Romanian historian, essayist, philosopher, journalist, novelist and diplomat (b. 1916)

Holidays and observances
Betico Day (Aruba)
Burns Night (Scotland)
Christian feast day:
Dydd Santes Dwynwen (Wales)
Feast of the Conversion of Saint Paul (Eastern Orthodox, Oriental Orthodox, Roman Catholic, Anglican and Lutheran churches, which concludes the Week of Prayer for Christian Unity)
Gregory the Theologian (Eastern (Byzantine) Catholic Church)
The last day of the Week of Prayer for Christian Unity (Christian ecumenism)
January 25 (Eastern Orthodox liturgics)
National Nutrition Day (Indonesia)
National Police Day (Egypt)
National Voters' Day (India)
Revolution Day 2011 (Egypt)
Tatiana Day or Russian Students Day (Russia, Eastern Orthodox)

References

External links

 BBC: On This Day
 
 Historical Events on January 25

Days of the year
January